USS Susan B. Anthony (AP-72) was a turbo-electric ocean liner,  Santa Clara, of the Grace Steamship Company that was built in 1930.  Santa Clara was turned over to the War Shipping Administration (WSA) on 28 February 1942 and operated by Grace Lines as agent for WSA as a troop ship making voyages to the South Pacific. The ship was chartered to the Navy on 7 August 1942 for operation as a United States Navy transport ship.  The ship was sunk 7 June 1944 off Normandy by a mine while cruising through a swept channel with all 2,689 people aboard being saved.

Building and civilian service
The New York Shipbuilding Corporation of Camden, New Jersey completed the ship in March 1930 and named her the SS Santa Clara.

Santa Clara was turbo-electric: her boilers supplied steam to two turbo generators which fed current to electric motors connected to her twin propeller shafts. General Electric made her turbo generators and propulsion motors, and her power output was rated at 2,660 NHP

Santa Clara gave more than a decade of civilian service.  Notable passengers included Walt Disney and his staff in 1941 had been in Chile researching for their film The Three Caballeros.  They left Valparaíso on the Santa Clara on 4 October and reached New York on 20 October.

World War II
On 28 February 1942 Santa Clara was delivered at New York to the War Shipping Administration (WSA) by Grace Lines with that line operating the ship as a WSA transport allocated to Army transportation requirements under a general agency agreement. On 11 March the agreement terms were changed to bareboat charter by WSA.

WSA troopship
The ship was converted from commercial configuration by Robins Dry Dock & Repair Company in New York in late February. During this period Santa Clara is shown as being in the Pacific and in at least one large convoy, BT-201, departing New York on 4 March and arriving Brisbane on 6 April 1942. During that voyage the ship had stopped at Bora Bora on the way to Australia and Melbourne, Townsville and Wellington before returning to San Francisco on 11 May 1942. Santa Clara returned to the South Pacific departing San Francisco on 26 May destined for Auckland and Bora Bora before crossing the Pacific to Buenaventura, Colombia and then transiting the Panama Canal on 9 July bound for New York. On 7 August 1942 Santa Clara was delivered to the Navy at New York on a sub bareboat charter basis.

Navy service
After delivery to the Navy  Bethlehem Shipbuilding Corporation's New York yard converted Santa Clara for Navy troop transport service. The Navy renamed the ship after the women's suffrage and women's rights campaigner Susan B. Anthony, making her one of the few Naval vessels named after a woman. She was commissioned on 7 September 1942 as USS Susan B. Anthony, with the designation AP-72, under the command of Captain Henry Hartley.

Invasion of North Africa, 1942
After almost a month of drills and exercises in the lower Chesapeake Bay, the transport — carrying troops and equipment — left the bay on 23 October for Operation Torch, the Allied invasion of North Africa. At the end of a 15-day crossing, she reached the transport area off Mehdia, French Morocco. Early the next morning, on 8 November, the Northern Attack Group opened the assault on Mehdia and Port Lyautey. Despite the general difficulties encountered in handling landing craft, she disembarked her troops and unloaded their equipment in relatively good order. She stayed in the area for a week before sailing on the 15th for Safi, Morocco to unload the rest of her cargo. On 18 November she left Safi for Norfolk, Virginia, and arrived at Hampton Roads on the last day of the month.

Over the next seven months Susan B. Anthony made three voyages bringing troops and supplies across the Atlantic to North Africa;  the first to Casablanca and the remainder to Oran, Algeria.

Invasion of Sicily, 1943
After a brief voyage to the Gulf of Arzeu ferrying men and equipment, she returned to Oran on 25 June 1943 to prepare for the Allied invasion of Sicily. She embarked men and loaded material on 30 June-1 July, refueled on the 2nd, and left Oran three days later.

Anthony approached the coast of Sicily on the 9th near the town of Scoglitti. She spent the early hours of the next day landing troops and equipment. By 0435 hrs enemy aircraft were attacking the ships of the assault force. Bombs fell close to Anthony but she emerged with only minor damage from bomb fragments. Just before 0600 hrs she started toward the inshore anchorage, but withdrew after shore batteries fired on her. About four hours later she was able to enter the anchorage and send her salvage crew to aid broached and disabled landing craft.

Through that day and the next she came under repeated air attacks. Just after 2200 hrs on the 11th a twin-engine plane commenced an attack run at her, but by the time it had closed within , her anti-aircraft guns had shot it down in flames. Less than 10 minutes later another enemy bomber met a similar fate.

Late in the afternoon of 12 July Susan B. Anthony left for Oran. There she loaded prisoners; sailed for the US; and reached New York on 3 August 1943.

Atlantic convoys, 1943–44
For the next 10 months Anthony crossed and recrossed the Atlantic moving soldiers and cargo between various ports in the US, England, Iceland, Northern Ireland and Scotland in preparation for Operation Overlord, the cross-channel invasion of Europe at Normandy. On these voyages she visited ports including Belfast, Northern Ireland; Holy Loch, Gourock, and Glasgow in Scotland; Hvalfjörður and Reykjavík, Iceland; Mumbles and Milford Haven in Wales, and Newport.

Sinking off Normandy, 7 June 1944

Early in the morning of 7 June 1944, while transporting soldiers of the 90th Infantry Division through a swept channel off Normandy en route to Utah Beach, Susan B. Anthony struck a mine that exploded under her number 4 hold. Immediately she lost all power, and her rudder went hard left and stuck. By 0805 hrs, holds numbers 4 and 5 were shipping water badly, and the ship took on an 8° list to starboard. In an effort to save his ship, the commanding officer, Commander TL Gray, USNR, ordered the embarked soldiers to move to the port side. This human ballast soon brought Anthony back to an even keel.

At 0822 hrs fleet tug  came alongside, prepared to tow the paralyzed Anthony to shallow water. However, fires soon erupted in her engine and fire rooms, and she began to settle more rapidly. The captain now concluded that the ship was lost and ordered her abandoned. With Pinto and two destroyers alongside, the troops were evacuated expeditiously and without resorting to lifeboats and rafts. Anthonys crew followed closely behind the soldiers. By 0905 hrs, the main deck was awash at the stern and she was listing badly. The last member of the salvage crew hit the water at about 1000 hrs, with Commander Gray soon following.

At 1010 hrs Susan B. Anthony sank about 10 miles (16 km) from the French coast at a depth of 70 feet (20 m). No one was killed, and few of the 45 wounded were seriously hurt. All 2,689 people aboard were saved, which the Guinness Book of World Records lists as the largest rescue of people without loss of life.  Samuel Tankersley Williams, then a brigadier general serving as assistant division commander of the 90th Infantry Division, received the Soldier's Medal for non-combat heroism in recognition of his efforts to evacuate the ship.  Even though he didn't know how to swim, Williams personally braved smoke, heat, and flames to search the ship and ensure that no one was left behind.  Susan B. Anthony was struck from the Naval Vessel Register on 29 July 1944.

Honors
Susan B. Anthony was awarded three service stars for World War II service.

References

Bibliography

External links

Blog post containing images of the sinking of the USS Susan B.  Anthony taken by a witness

1930 ships
Passenger ships of the United States
Ships built by New York Shipbuilding Corporation
Ships sunk by mines
Turbo-electric steamships
Troop ships of the War Shipping Administration
Unique transports of the United States Navy
World War II auxiliary ships of the United States
World War II shipwrecks in the English Channel
Ships sunk with no fatalities
Maritime incidents in June 1944